Doby Creek is a  long 2nd order tributary to Mallard Creek in Mecklenburg County, North Carolina.

Course
Doby Creek rises in the Derita community of Charlotte, North Carolina and then flows generally northeast through the northern suburbs of Charlotte to eventually join Mallard Creek.

Watershed
Doby Creek drains  of area, receives about 46.4 in/year of precipitation, has a wetness index of 433.22, and is about 18% forested.

References

Rivers of North Carolina
Rivers of Mecklenburg County, North Carolina